The Italian general election of 2018 took place on 4 March 2018.

In Trentino the centre-right coalition, dominated by the League, beat the centre-left coalition for the first time since 1996. In South Tyrol the South Tyrolean People's Party (SVP) was confirmed as the largest party. Under the new electoral system, which re-introduced single-seat constituencies also for the Chamber, the centre-right won all such constituencies in Trentino, while the SVP-dominated centre-left prevailed in all the single-seat constituencies of South Tyrol.

Results
Chamber of Deputies

Senate of the Republic

PR vote in Trentino

PR vote in South Tyrol

Elected MPs

Chamber of Deputies
Lega
Maurizio Fugatti
Diego Binelli
Giulia Zanotelli
Vanessa Cattoi
Stefania Segnana
South Tyrolean People's Party–PATT
Albrecht Plangger (SVP)
Renate Gebhard (SVP)
Manfred Schullian (SVP)
Emanuela Rossini (PATT)
Democratic Party
Maria Elena Boschi
Five Star Movement
Riccardo Fraccaro

Senate
South Tyrolean People's Party–PATT
Julia Unterberger (SVP)
Dieter Steger (SVP)
Meinhard Durnwalder (SVP)
Forza Italia
Elena Testor (AF)
Donatella Conzatti (Indep.)
Democratic Party
Gianclaudio Bressa
Five Star Movement
Andrea De Bertoldi

Elections in Trentino-Alto Adige/Südtirol
2018 elections in Italy
March 2018 events in Italy